The 1998–99 Pro Tour season was the fourth season of the Magic: The Gathering Pro Tour. It began on 5 September 1998 with Grand Prix Boston and ended on 8 August 1999 with the conclusion of 1999 World Championship in Tokyo. The season consisted of fourteen Grand Prix, and five Pro Tours, located in Chicago, Rome, Los Angeles, New York, and Tokyo. At the end of the season Kai Budde from Germany was awarded the Pro Player of the year title.

Grand Prix – Boston, Lisbon 

GP Boston (5–6 September)
 Jon Finkel
 Randy Buehler
 Steven O'Mahoney-Schwartz
 Zvi Mowshowitz
 Darwin Kastle
 Mike Bregoli
 Dave Beury
 Ben Farkas

GP Lisbon (12–13 September)
 Bruno Cardoso
 Brian Hacker
 Randy Buehler
 Helder Coelho
 Jean-Louis D'Hondt
 Laurent Pagorek
 Alexis Dumay
 Jorge Martins

Pro Tour – Chicago (25–27 September 1998) 

As in the previous season a rookie won the inaugural Pro Tour. In the finals Dirk Baberowski defeated Casey McCarrel. Jon Finkel also had another final eight showing, his third in a row.

Tournament data 
Prize pool: $151,635
Players: 324
Format: Tempest Booster Draft (Tempest-Stronghold-Exodus)
Head Judge: Charlie Catino

Top 8 

Loser's Bracket

Pro Tour Chicago also had Top 8 loser's bracket, that had matches held as best of three instead of five. The first round paired the quarter-finals losers against each other. Finkel defeated Coene 2–1 and Fuller defeated Cedercrantz 2–0. In the second and final round the winners of the first round were paired against the losers of the Top 8 semi-finals. Fung defeated Finkel 2–1 and Klauser defeated Fuller 2–1.

Final standings

Grand Prix – Austin, Birmingham 

GP Austin (10–11 October)
 Gary Krakower
 Darwin Kastle
 Heath Kennel
 Richard Van Cleave
 Jeremy Baca
 Tony Tsai
 Sid Rao
 Jonathan Pechon

GP Birmingham (17–18 October)
 Craig Jones
 Kai Budde
 Darwin Kastle
 Neil Rigby
 Arho Toikka
 Warren Marsh
 Andreas Jonsson
 Jean-Louis D'Hondt

Pro Tour – Rome (13–15 November 1998) 

Tommi Hovi won Pro Tour Rome, thus becoming the first player to win two Pro Tours. Reportedly Hovi was particularly happy to win another Pro Tour, because he won his first due to a disqualification, and thus felt it was not a proper victory. Olle Råde became the first player to have five Top 8 appearances.

Tournament data 
Prize pool: $151,635
Players: 266
Format: Extended
Head Judge: Carl Crook

Top 8 

Loser's Bracket

The first round of the loser's bracket paired the quarter-finals losers against each other. Le Pine defeated Lauer 2–0 and Gary defeated Konstanczer 2–1. In the second and final round of the loser's bracket the winners of the first round were paired against the losers of the Top 8 semi-finals. Dato defeated Gary 2–1 and Le Pine defeated Råde 2–1.

Final standings

Grand Prix – Manila, Kyoto, San Francisco, Barcelona 

GP Manila (12–13 December)
 Toshiki Tsukamoto
 Scion Raguindin
 Josua Rivera
 Leo Gonzales
 Rozano Yu
 Francis Robert Profeta
 GeeVee Vegara
 Itaru Ishida

GP San Francisco (23–24 January)
 Richard Van Cleave
 Mark Schick
 John Yoo
 Alan Comer
 Mike Craig
 Shawn Keller
 Hashim Bello
 Shawn Roush

GP Kyoto (16–17 January)
 Yoshikazu Ishii
 Hiroshi Watanabe
 Masami Ibamoto
 Tsuyoshi Fujita
 Tadayoshi Komiya
 Hirobumi Nakamura
 Hideaki Amano
 Eisaku Sueyoshi

GP Barcelona (6–7 February)
 Kai Budde
 Alex Shvartsman
 Roc Herms
 Raphaël Lévy
 Daniel Nuttal
 Matt Henstra
 Laurent Laclavie
 Gordon Benson

Pro Tour – Los Angeles (26–28 February 1999) 

Steven O'Mahoney-Schwartz won Pro Tour Los Angeles defeating his friend and fellow New Yorker Jon Finkel in the final.

Tournament data 

Prize pool: $151,635
Players: 337
Format: Urza's Saga Rochester Draft (Urza's Saga)
Head Judge: Charlie Catino

Top 8 

* = The semi-final of O'Mahoney-Schwartz against Lau went over six games. One of the games had been a draw. After five games the score was 2–2 and a draw, thus the sixth game became necessary.

Final standings

Grand Prix – Vienna, Kansas City, Oslo, Taipei 

GP Vienna (13–14 March)
 Kai Budde
 Christian Gregorich
 Jon Finkel
 Erik Lauer
 Randy Buehler
 Jakub Slemr
 Dirk Hein
 Peer Kröger

GP Oslo (10–11 April)
 Jim Herold
 Mikko Lintamo
 Christer Ljones
 Bjørn Ove Leknes Skogneth
 Seppo Toikka
 Steven O'Mahoney-Schwartz
 André Konstanczer
 Jonathan Brown

GP Kansas City (27–28 March)
 Mark Gordon
 Chris Pikula
 Bob Maher, Jr.
 Scott Seville
 Jon Finkel
 Lan D. Ho
 Randy Buehler
 Vincent Johnson

GP Taipei (24–25 April)
 Kenichi Fujita
 Iwao Takemasa
 Tobey Tamber
 Itaru Ishida
 Chi Fai Ng
 Kai Cheog Tang
 Alex Shvartsman
 Miller Tsai

Pro Tour – New York (30 April – 2 May 1999) 

In the finals of Pro Tour New York Casey McCarrel defeated Shawn Keller, both playing nearly identical decks, which was designed by Ben Rubin, Lan D. Ho, and Terry Tsang, who also made the Top 8 with the deck. The concept of their decks was to quickly generate huge amounts of mana to play big spells. Rob Dougherty and David Humpherys played nearly identical decks, designed by YMG.

Tournament data 

Prize pool: $151,635
Players: 308
Format: Urza's Saga Block Constructed (Urza's Saga, Urza's Legacy)
Head Judge: Dan Gray

Top 8

Final standings

Grand Prix – Amsterdam, Washington D.C.

GP Amsterdam (15–16 May)
 Kai Budde
 Dirk Baberowski
 André Konstanczer
 Guido Pacifici
 Bram Snepvangers
 Janosch Kühn
 Daniel Steinsdorfer
 Vincent Gieling

GP Washington D.C. (19–20 June)
 Ben Farkas
 Chris Pikula
 Noah Weil
 Zvi Mowshowitz
 Mike Turian
 Scott McCord
 Mark Le Pine
 Dennis Bentley

1999 World Championships – Yokohama (4–8 August 1999) 

Kai Budde won the 1999 World Championship, defeating Mark Le Pine in the finals. The match went into the books as the shortest individual Pro Tour final ever, taking about 20 minutes. The title allowed Budde to take the Pro Player of the year title as well.

The United States defeated Germany in the team finals to win the national team title.

Tournament data 

Prize pool: $250,000
Players: 208
Individual formats: Urza's Saga Rochester Draft (Urza's Saga-Urza's Legacy-Urza's Destiny), Standard, Extended
Team formats: Team Sealed (Urza's Saga-Urza's Legacy-Urza's Destiny) – Swiss; Standard – Finals
Head Judge: Charlie Catino

Top 8

Final standings

National team competition 

 United States (Kyle Rose, John Hunka, Zvi Mowshowitz, Charles Kornblith)
 Germany (Marco Blume, Patrick Mello, David Brucker, Rosario Maij)
 Norway (Nicolai Herzog, Sturla Bingen, Bjorn Joumsen, Marius Johnsen)
 Sweden (Jimmy Oman, Richard Soderberg, Ken Asp, Kristian Hellman)

Pro Player of the year final standings 

After the World Championship Kai Budde was awarded the Pro Player of the year title.

References 

Magic: The Gathering professional events